Levis Meraai Swartbooi (born 18 March 1984) is a Namibian retired footballer who played as a forward. He was a member of the Namibia national team.

Early life
Swartbooi was born in Walvis Bay (then in South Africa, but part of modern-day Namibia).

Club career
Swartbooi played professionally in Angola with Clube Desportivo Primeiro de Agosto.

References

1984 births
Living people
Association football forwards
Namibian men's footballers
Sportspeople from Walvis Bay
Namibia international footballers
2008 Africa Cup of Nations players
C.D. Primeiro de Agosto players
Namibian expatriate footballers
Namibian expatriate sportspeople in Angola
Expatriate footballers in Angola